The  is a Japanese political party. It was founded by Hidemitsu Sano in July 2013.

See also
 None of the above

References

External links
No Party to Support 

2013 establishments in Japan
E-democracy
Political parties established in 2013
Political parties in Japan